New London Academy may refer to:
United States Coast Guard Academy, New London, Connecticut
New London Academy (Pennsylvania)
New London Academy (Virginia)
A former name for Colby–Sawyer College, New Hampshire